Ozark Christian College is a private evangelical Christian college in Joplin, Missouri. It is affiliated with the Restoration Movement of Christian churches and churches of Christ.

Academics
The college's stated purpose is to "train men and women for Christian service" through an undergraduate Bible college education. Coursework focuses almost exclusively on the Bible, ministry training, and related topics. A dual degree program with Missouri Southern State University lets students earn two bachelor's degrees — one from each college — to serve in a variety of fields. OCC also offers an entire degree online.

Accreditation
Ozark was initially accredited by the American Association of Bible Colleges (now the Association for Biblical Higher Education) in 1988. It is also accredited by the Higher Learning Commission.

Athletics
Ozark's varsity sports teams are known as the Ambassadors and include men's and women's basketball, men's soccer, women's volleyball, and men's and women's cross country. Athletic teams are members of the Midwest Christian College Conference and the National Christian College Association of Athletics. Intramural sports include Ultimate Frisbee, futsal, volleyball, and basketball. Ozark's Multi-Purpose Building provides a full-size basketball/volleyball floor, indoor walking/running area, weight room, cardio room, racquetball court, locker rooms, and theater seating. The campus also includes outdoor basketball goals, tennis courts, a sand volleyball pit, and a soccer field.

LGBT Prohibition and discrimination
	 
The college has expelled students for gay or lesbian relationships. The college has a partial exemption from Title IX which allows it to discriminate against LGBT students for religious reasons.

References

External links
Official website

 
Association for Biblical Higher Education
Seminaries and theological colleges in Missouri
Universities and colleges affiliated with the Christian churches and churches of Christ
Buildings and structures in Joplin, Missouri
Educational institutions established in 1942
Association of Christian College Athletics member schools
Bible colleges
Education in Joplin, Missouri
1942 establishments in Missouri